Pawn Stars is an American reality television series.

Pawn Stars may also refer to:
 Pawn Stars Australia, Australian TV series
 Pawn Stars UK, UK TV series

See also
 Cajun Pawn Stars, American TV series
 Hardcore Pawn, American TV series